Events from the year 1800 in Spain.

Incumbents
 Monarch – Charles IV

Events

 1805 - Battle of Trafalgar, ended Spanish sea power
 1808 to 1813 - Peninsular War
 1813 to 1824 - Spanish Empire Collapse
 -  Battle of Puerto Plata Harbor
 - Ferrol Expedition (1800)
 - Third Treaty of San Ildefonso

Births

Deaths

References

 
Years of the 19th century in Spain